Southern Maryland Roller Derby (SMRD) is a women's flat track roller derby league based in Waldorf, Maryland. Founded in 2011, the league consists of a single team which competes against teams from other leagues, and is a member of the Women's Flat Track Derby Association (WFTDA).

History
Southern Maryland Roller Derby was founded in 2012 by five co-founders.
The league first bouted in 2014, with their first road game against Five 40 Roller Girls in May, and their first home game against Salisbury Roller Girls in July.

WFTDA
Southern Maryland entered the WFTDA Apprentice Program in January 2015, and was made a full member of the WFTDA in January 2016.

WFTDA rankings

 NR = no end-of-year ranking assigned

References

Roller derby leagues established in 2012
Roller derby leagues in Maryland
Women's sports in the United States
Waldorf, Maryland
2012 establishments in Maryland
Women in Maryland